Route 121 is a mostly north/south provincial highway in the Canadian province of New Brunswick, although it's signed as an east/west highway. The road runs from the Route 1 intersection in Hampton. The road is approximately 40 kilometres, and services small, otherwise isolated, rural communities. In these areas, the highway is often unofficially referred to as "Main Street." The road parallels Route 1 and follows the Kennebecasis River. The highway starts in Hampton as Hall Road, then Main Street.  It is also called Main Street in Sussex.

History

Route 121 was commissioned in 1968 when Route 1 was moved to a new alignment on the south shore of the Kennebecasis River.

Intersecting routes
 Begins merged with Route 100 over exit 158 at Route 1 in Hampton
separates from highway 100 on Main St in Hampton
 Route 845 in Hampton
 Route 855 in Bloomfield
 Route 124 in Norton
 Route 880 in Apohaqui
 Route 1 in Sussex
 Ends at Route 111 in Sussex

River crossings
 Kennebecasis River in Hampton
 Millstream River in Apohaqui
 Kennebecasis River, in Sussex

Communities along the Route
Hampton
Central Norton
Norton
Riverbank
Apohaqui
Fox Hill
Sussex

See also
List of New Brunswick provincial highways

References

121
121
Hampton, New Brunswick
Roads in Kings County, New Brunswick